The Essential Doc Watson is the title of a recording by Doc Watson, released in 1973. It was originally released as a double-LP.

The first LP of the original release contains studio recordings from Watson's early Vanguard releases. The second LP  tracks were recorded live at the Newport Folk Festival in 1964 and 1965. It was re-issued on CD in 1991.

Reception

Writing for Allmusic, music critic Bruce Eder gave the compilation 5 of 5 stars and wrote of the album "As for the music itself, it's about as wide and varied a body as one could wish for... Although it's not as thorough an account of his musicianship as the four-CD Vanguard Years compilation, this disc does give any neophyte a good look at what he's about, and the music is excellent on its own terms."

Track listing
All songs Traditional unless otherwise noted.
 "Tom Dooley" – 3:13
 "Alberta" (Lead Belly) – 2:40
 "Froggie Went A-Courtin'" – 4:02
 "Beaumont Rag" – 1:37
 "St. James Hospital" (James "Iron Head" Baker) – 3:25
 "Muskrat" – 2:51
 "Down in the Valley to Pray" – 1:57
 "Blue Railroad Train" (Alton Delmore, Rabon Delmore) – 2:41
 "Rising Sun Blues" (Ashley) –4:17
 "Shady Grove" – 2:55
 "My Rough and Rowdy Ways" (Elsie McWilliams, Jimmie Rodgers) –  2:28
 "The Train That Carried My Girl from Town" – 3:45
Live from the Newport Folk Festival:
 "Black Mountain Rag" – 1:30
 "I Was a Stranger" (Jimmie Rodgers) – 3:05
 "Blue Ridge Mountain Blues" – 2:20
 "Country Blues" (Dock Boggs) – 3:05
 "Ground Hog" – 1:40
 "Little Orphan Girl" – 2:50
 "Blackberry Blossom" – 1:50
 "Going Down the Road Feeling Bad" – 2:05
 "Rambling Hobo" – 0:56
 "Omie Wise" – 4:05
 "Handsome Molly" – 2:00
 "White House Blues" – 1:30
 "I Want to Love Him More" – 2:05
 "Way Downtown" – 2:00

Personnel
Doc Watson – guitar, banjo, harmonica, vocals
Merle Watson – banjo, guitar
Gaither Carlton – fiddle
Floyd Cramer – piano
Buddy Harman – drums
Clint Howard – vocals
Roy M. "Junior" Huskey – bass
Shot Jackson – dobro
Tommy Jackson – fiddle
Grady Martin – dobro, guitar
Fred Price – fiddle
Russ Savakus – bass
Buddy Spicher – fiddle
Don Stover – banjo
Arnold Watson – banjo, vocals
Mrs. General Dixon Watson – vocals
Eric Weissberg – bass

References

1973 greatest hits albums
Doc Watson compilation albums
Vanguard Records compilation albums